Sergio Rodríguez Hurtado (born 7 September 1992) is a Spanish footballer who plays as a winger for Lora CF.

Club career
Born in Seville, Andalusia, Rodríguez graduated from Real Betis' youth setup. On 21 May 2011, before even having appearing for the reserves, he played his first match as a professional, coming on as a late substitute in a 3–1 Segunda División home win against SD Huesca.

Rodríguez was definitely promoted to the B team in the summer of 2011, and made his La Liga debut on 22 September, again coming from the bench in a 4–3 home victory over Real Zaragoza. On 16 July 2013, he signed a new four-year contract with the club.

On 22 January 2014, Rodríguez was loaned to Segunda División side CD Lugo until the end of the season. He returned to the Estadio Benito Villamarín in July, being assigned to the main squad.

On 2 February 2015, after making no appearances during the campaign, Rodríguez was loaned to Gimnàstic de Tarragona from Segunda División B until June. He was released by Betis after his loan ended, and subsequently joined AD Alcorcón on 25 July.

Rodríguez spent the following seasons in lower league or amateur football. He also played in the Andorran Primera Divisió, with UE Sant Julià.

References

External links

Beticopedia profile 

1992 births
Living people
Spanish footballers
Footballers from Seville
Association football wingers
La Liga players
Segunda División players
Segunda División B players
Tercera División players
Divisiones Regionales de Fútbol players
Betis Deportivo Balompié footballers
Real Betis players
CD Lugo players
Gimnàstic de Tarragona footballers
AD Alcorcón footballers
La Roda CF players
Arcos CF players
CD San Roque de Lepe footballers
CD Gerena players
Primera Divisió players
UE Sant Julià players
Spanish expatriate footballers
Expatriate footballers in Andorra
Spanish expatriate sportspeople in Andorra